Gregory Nelson (born 31 January 1988) is a Dutch professional footballer who last played for Chennaiyin FC in the Indian Super League, as a winger.

Early and personal life
Born in Amsterdam, Nelson is of Surinamese descent.

Club career
Nelson began his career with AZ and RBC, playing for the latter after a loan deal was made permanent.

After being released by RBC following their bankruptcy, he was without a club until he signed for Bulgarian club CSKA Sofia in June 2010.

In January 2012, he signed for Ukrainian club Metalurh Donetsk on a three-and-a-half year contract. During his time in the Ukraine, a war with Russia began, and the club had to relocate to Kiev for safety.

In October 2015, after Metalurh Donetsk went bankrupt, he returned to Bulgaria to sign for Botev Plovdiv. On 23 October 2015, on his debut for the club, Nelson scored the winning goal against Pirin Blagoevgrad.

In January 2017 he signed for Kazakhstan Premier League side FC Kaisar. After his contract was terminated shortly afterwards for personal reasons, he joined Bahraini Premier League side Al-Muharraq.

After his contract with Al-Muharraq expired, in September 2017 he signed for Chennaiyin FC in the Indian Super League. He left the club in April 2019.

International career
In June 2011, Nelson expressed interest in representing Suriname at international level.

Honours
Chennaiyin FC
 Indian Super League: 2017–18

References

1988 births
Living people
Footballers from Amsterdam
Dutch footballers
AZ Alkmaar players
RBC Roosendaal players
PFC CSKA Sofia players
FC Metalurh Donetsk players
Botev Plovdiv players
FC Kaisar players
Al-Muharraq SC players
Chennaiyin FC players
Eredivisie players
Eerste Divisie players
First Professional Football League (Bulgaria) players
Ukrainian Premier League players
Bahraini Premier League players
Indian Super League players
Association football wingers
Dutch expatriate footballers
Dutch expatriate sportspeople in Bulgaria
Expatriate footballers in Bulgaria
Dutch expatriate sportspeople in Ukraine
Expatriate footballers in Ukraine
Dutch expatriate sportspeople in Kazakhstan
Expatriate footballers in Kazakhstan
Dutch expatriate sportspeople in Bahrain
Expatriate footballers in Bahrain
Dutch expatriate sportspeople in India
Expatriate footballers in India